is a women's volleyball team based in Kurobe, Toyama, Japan. It plays in V.League Division 1 Women. The club was founded in 1998.
It is operated by Kurobe city Athletic Association.

History
It was founded in 1998.
It was promoted to V.Challenge League in 2001.
It was promoted to V.League Division 1 Women in 2018.

Honours
V.Challenge League
Champion(1) - 2004

League results

Current squad
2022-2023 Squad as of 09 February - 2023 

 Head coach:  Katsuaki Ito

Former players

Domestic players

Hiroko Hakuta (2002–2006)
Hokaku Cho (2008–09)
Mayumi Kosuge (2011–2012)
Ayano Inishi (2009–2012)
Yuki Tanaka (2008–2013)
Nao Murakami (2007–2013)
Nanami Wasai (2014-2019) Transferred to PFU BlueCats
Rina Hiratani (2014-2019)
Natsuno Kurami (2014-2019)
Natsumi Watabiki (2017–2020) Transferred to PFU BlueCats
Ranna Shiraiwa (2018–2020) Transferred to Forest Leaves Kumamoto (ja)
Saki Maruyama (2014–2021)
Yurika Banba (2017–2021)

Foreign players
 
 Freya Aelbrecht (2018-2019)
 
  Aleona Denise Manabat (2019–2020)
 
 Juliann Faucette 2017–2018)
 Simone Lee (2019–2021)
 
 Pimpichaya Kokram (2021–Present)

References

External links
AquaFairies Official website

Japanese volleyball teams
Sports teams in Toyama Prefecture
Volleyball clubs established in 1998
1998 establishments in Japan